The International Journal of Politics, Culture, and Society is a quarterly peer-reviewed academic journal covering political science, social theory, and economics. The editor-in-chief is Patrick Baert (University of Cambridge). It was established in 1987 and is published by Springer Science+Business Media.

Abstracting and indexing 
The journal is abstracted and indexed in:
EBSCO databases
Emerging Sources Citation Index
International Bibliography of the Social Sciences
International Political Science Abstracts
ProQuest databases
Scopus

References

External links

English-language journals
Springer Science+Business Media
Publications established in 1987
Quarterly journals
Political science journals